Inamma (English: Elder Sister-In-Law)  is a 2019 Indian Meitei language film directed by Homeshwori and produced by Takhellambam Chandrakumar, under the banner of Home Films. The movie stars Bala Hijam in the titular role. The other leading actors in the movie are Gokul Athokpam, Gurumayum Bonny, Devita Urikhinbam, Shilheiba Ningthoujam and Biju Ningombam. It was premiered at Bhagyachandra Open Air Theatre (BOAT), Imphal on 14 September 2019.

The film is based on the Shumang Kumhei of the same title. In Shumang Kumhei, there is a sequel titled Mama (Inamma 2). But the stories of both the Shumang Kumheis are put together in the single movie.

Plot
Arubi often plots against her Inamma, Memtombi, for no good reason. Chingkheinganba is aware but never acts against his sister for the sake of maintaining peace in the family. When one of Arubi's plan against Memtombi fails miserably and her brother gets to face the consequences, she elopes with her boyfriend Ngahakchao. When Bem (Ngahakchao's sister) treats her Inamma, Arubi with care and respect, Arubi is filled with regret and remorse for her acts done to her Inamma. She begs for forgiveness.

Unfortunately, Memtombi dies while giving birth to her first child. To make up for the loss, Arubi plans to marry Bem to her brother. This creates a tension among the lovebirds Bem and Nongyai, the latter also happens to be Memtombi's younger brother. When Chingkheinganba discovers this, he foils Arubi's plan.

Cast
 Bala Hijam as Memtombi
 Gokul Athokpam as Chingkheinganba, Memtombi's husband
 Gurumayum Bonny as Ngahakchao
 Devita Urikhinbam as Arubi, Memtombi's sister-in-law
 Shilheiba Ningthoujam as Dr. Nongyai, Memtombi's younger brother
 Biju Ningombam as Bem, Ngahakchao's younger sister
 Ningthouja Jayvidya as Pakchao, Arubi's father
 Idhou as Agor Momon, Ngahakchao's father

Accolades
Inamma won two awards out of 6 nominations at the 9th MANIFA 2020 organised by Sahitya Seva Samiti, Kakching.

Soundtrack
Nanao Sagolmang composed the soundtrack for the film and Rajmani Ayekpam and Ranjit Ningthouja wrote the lyrics. The songs are titled Leinana Yomlibi and Nungshikhreda.

References

2010s Meitei-language films
2019 films